Nagasandra Hanumantha Shivashankara Reddy is an Indian politician who is a Member of the Karnataka Legislative Assembly from the INC. He is the former deputy speaker of the Karnataka Legislative Assembly and 2018 Agriculture minister of Karnataka.

Political career
Reddy was first elected to the Karnataka legislative assembly in 1999 as an independent candidate after being denied an INC ticket. Prior to this, he had served at the village council level. In the subsequent three State legislative assembly elections, Reddy contested as an INC nominee and won each time.

In July 2013, he was elected the Deputy Speaker of the Assembly in a unanimous election upon being the only candidate to file the nomination papers.

He is the Minister for Agriculture for Karnataka state, since June 2018.

Personal life and education
Reddy was born on 24 September 1954 in a Vokkaliga family in H. Nagasandra, a village in Gowribidanur taluk, (in present-day Chikkaballapura district of Karnataka) to Subhashanamma and N. S. Hanumantha Reddy. An affluent family, it consisted of multiple independence activists. Reddy holds a bachelor's degree in agricultural sciences from the University of Agricultural Sciences, Dharwad.

References

External links 
 
 N. H. Shivashankara Reddy bio in Kannada

1954 births
Living people
Indian National Congress politicians from Karnataka
Karnataka MLAs 1999–2004
Karnataka MLAs 2004–2007
Karnataka MLAs 2008–2013